Eugène Salami (born 5 February 1989) is a Nigerian footballer, currently playing in Hungary for Kiskőrös.

External links
HLSZ 

1989 births
People from Abuja
Living people
Nigerian footballers
Association football forwards
Niger Tornadoes F.C. players
Debreceni VSC players
Nyíregyháza Spartacus FC players
Kecskeméti TE players
Czech First League players
FK Teplice players
Kiskőrösi FC footballers
Nemzeti Bajnokság I players
Nigerian expatriate footballers
Expatriate footballers in Hungary
Nigerian expatriate sportspeople in Hungary